Gurpreet Singh born 29 October 1979 is representative for India in the sport of Kabaddi. He was a member of the kabaddi team that won a gold medal in the 2014 Asian Games in Incheon.

References

Living people
1979 births
Indian kabaddi players
Asian Games medalists in kabaddi
Kabaddi players at the 2014 Asian Games
Asian Games gold medalists for India
Medalists at the 2014 Asian Games

Pro Kabaddi League players